KRKN (104.3 FM, "New Country 104.3") is a radio station broadcasting a country music format. Licensed to Eldon, Iowa, United States, the station serves the Ottumwa area. The station is currently owned by Greg List, through licensee O-Town Communications, Inc.

References

External links
 
 

Country radio stations in the United States
RKN
Radio stations established in 1983